The Château de Roquetaillade is a castle in Mazères (near Bordeaux), in the French département of Gironde.

History
Charlemagne, on his way to the Pyrenees with Roland, built the first fortification there. Of this old castle, nothing remains but imposing ruins.

In 1306, with the permission of the English King Edward I, Cardinal de la Mothe, nephew of Pope Clement V built a second fortress (le Château Neuf).

This new castle was square in plan with six towers and a central keep. The entire structure was restored and transformed by Viollet-le-Duc and one of his pupils, Duthoit, between 1860 and 1870. The extraordinary interior decorations, with its furnishings and paintings, were created by Viollet-le-Duc and are listed as French Heritage.

The château park includes remains of the medieval curtain wall with the barbican, the Pesquey stream and its banks, the 19th century chalet, and the Crampet pigeon loft.

It has been listed since 1976 as a monument historique by the French Ministry of Culture and is open to the public.

Today
The castle has been lived in by the same family for over 700 years. It has been open to the public since 1956 and is the most visited in the Bordeaux region. Open all year round, visits in English with the owners are also possible.

Other activities at the castle include a famous production of white Graves wines "Chateaufort de Roquetaillade", and Bazadais cattle breeding.

The castle been used as a location in several films, including Fantômas contre Scotland Yard and Le Pacte des loups (Brotherhood of the Wolf).

See also
 List of castles in France

References

External links

 Official site in English
 Article and photos on the Château de Roquetaillade
 

Monuments historiques of Gironde
Castles in Nouvelle-Aquitaine
Historic house museums in Nouvelle-Aquitaine
Museums in Gironde